The 2020 Mesa mayoral election was held on August 4, 2020, to elect the mayor of Mesa, Arizona.

Incumbent mayor John Giles was re-elected to a second full term.

Candidates

Declared 
 Verl Farnsworth, retired construction contractor
 John Giles, incumbent mayor

Declined 
 Jeremy Whittaker, city councilman

Results

References

External links 
 Verl Farnsworth for Mayor 

2008
Mesa
Mesa